Villu is a 2009 Indian Tamil-language action comedy film written by AC Mugil and directed by Prabhu Deva. The film stars Vijay in a dual role while Nayanthara, Ranjitha, Prakash Raj, and Vadivelu play other prominent roles. Manoj K. Jayan, Devaraj, Adithya, Anandaraj, Sriman and Geetha play supporting roles whilst Prabhu Deva, Mumaith Khan, Zabyn Khan, and Khushbu appear in item numbers. The film is produced and distributed by Ayngaran International and composed by Devi Sri Prasad. Cinematography was done by Ravi Varman, while editing was handled by Kola Bhaskar. The film received negative reviews from critics and became an average at the box-office.

The film was released on 12 January 2009. The film acquired #221 spot in 2009 at the United Kingdom box office. Villu settled to a domestic profit of 50 lakhs. The story revolves around an assassin who infiltrates and destroys a criminal gang to avenge his father's death. The film's title Villu (bow) indicates a man Pugazh, who avenges for his father (arrow) fired at his enemies to destroy them. The satellite rights of the film was owned by Kalaignar TV. Rediff pointed out that, Vadivelu and Vijay were applauded for their style of slap-stick comedy in the film.

Media outlets reported that, the film Villu became an average domestic venture as Vijay and Vadivelu comic-timing was the only saving grace of the film, since the screenplay, dialogues and dubbing were extremely ordinary.  The movie was loosely based on the 1998 Hindi movie Soldier.

Plot
Pugazh is an IITian and Oxford alumnus with a master's degree in chemical engineering. With the help of his relative Inspector Joseph, he succeeds in tracking down a wanted criminal named Raaka and trapping him to Joseph. The scene then shifts to a village, where Pugazh is attending the wedding of a Tahsildar's daughter. He meets Janavi, a friend of the bride, and instantly falls in love with her. After persistent wooing, he succeeds in winning her heart.

Janavi takes Pugazh to Munich (Germany) to introduce him to her father J. D., a wealthy businessman and covert arms smuggler. During his stay in Bern, he encounters J. D.'s gang, consisting of Shaan, a hotel pimp named Max, and another henchman. After initial confrontations with the three of them, he starts eliminating them one after another, and then J. D. becomes his remaining target. Janavi soon finds out that Pugazh is plotting to kill her father and warns Pugazh's mother about her son. On the contrary, Pugazh's mother not only knows and supports what Pugazh is doing, she also reveals that she is not his real "mother" and tells her why Pugazh is after her father.

Pugazh's father was Major Saravanan, a patriotic Indian Army officer. During a peacekeeping mission, he noticed J. D., Shaan, Raaka, and their two henchmen, who were then army officers working in his team, accepting money from terrorists in exchange for allowing them to carry out their activities. When he confronted them, they killed him and fabricated a story claiming that since he accepted money from terrorists to help them, they killed him considering the safety of the other soldiers and themselves. He was stripped posthumously of his titles, honours, and badges. During his funeral, his family, consisting of his widow and a young Pugazh, were humiliated as the military withdrew his honors. the villagers banished them from their village. The villagers also barred Pugazh from performing his father's last rites and threw the dead body into a sand pit, where it got lost in sand storm. The villagers also brandish the forehead of Pugazh's mother with the title "wife of a traitor". She sends her son away with Shaan's estranged wife (the adopted "mother") as she did not want him to grow up carrying the stigma of being the son of a disgraced army officer.

In the present day, J. D. takes Pugazh to India to retrieve a Blu-ray containing J. D.'s secret information, which Pugazh had earlier received from Shaan and given to Joseph. Pugazh soon finds out that Raaka has escaped. Pugazh manages to flee from J. D.'s and Raaka's clutches, and after a thrilling chase, he reaches an abandoned temple outside his village where he reunites with his mother, who had been living there since being banished from the village. J. D., Raaka, and their henchmen arrive there. They kill Joseph and injure Pugazh. Pugazh kills Raaka and fights with J. D., weakening him. With all of the villagers assembled around the abandoned temple, Pugazh forces J. D. to reveal the truth about his father to them. After his confession, Pugazh kills him in revenge for his father's death. With the truth about Saravanan finally revealed, the army reinstates his titles, honours, and badges and also returns his army badge and uniform to his widow.

Cast

Production

Development 

Prabhu Deva along with announcing his venture in Bollywood titled Wanted Dead and Alive, which was the remake of Pokkiri, he launched his next Tamil venture in December 2007. Ayngaran International was to produce the film as well. The film was initially titled as Pugazh. Prabhu Deva later announced the titled to be Singam. However, a copyright issue was brought up concerning the title Singam, which was already announced as the title for a film by director Hari. Prabhu Deva then changed the titled to Vill, meaning "bow" in Tamil, a more formal spelling of Villu. The team later found out that S. J. Suryah was to use the title Vill for a Telugu film. Suryah, with the negotiation of Vijay, later changed his film's title. The title Villu subsequently became the film's official name.

Casting and filming 
Actress Ranjitha was selected to play Vijay's mother.
Director Prabhu Deva started shooting for  Villu with the team's first location being Palani, Tamil Nadu. The team's second location was set to be in Karaikudi. Prabhu Deva had reportedly planned two song sequences to be shot in European countries. Another song sequence was shot in Bangkok, Thailand. Later, reports claimed that the film's script and story would deal with a majority of the film taking place in Italy. Prabhu Deva had reportedly planned two song sequences to be shot in European countries. In an interview with Prabhu Deva, a month prior to the film's release, Prabhu Deva stated the film will be a "Tamil version of a James Bond film." It was reported that Prakash Raj was missing from shooting when the crew was shooting the climax.

The story was already made as a movie in Tamil during 1989 titled Thaai Naadu starring Sathyaraj in dual roles. Then this film was remade in Dhallywood as Jamin Nai by Syed Harun starring Shabnur, Shakti Kapoor & Miju Ahmed in lead roles in 2000 and Tamil as Villu By Prabhu Deva starring Vijay & Nayanthara in lead roles in 2009. Bobby Deol Starrer Soldier in 1998 has a similar story line.

Devi Sri Prasad, Kola Bhaskar and Ravi Varman were confirmed the film's composer, editor, and cinematographer respectively while FEFSI Vijayan was chosen as the stunt coordinator.

Vijay was Prabhu Deva's initial choice for the lead role. Prabhu Deva trusted the actor, due to their widely known friendship, after their success with Pokkiri the previous year. However, several critics and media had dubious thoughts on the choice of Vijay as the lead role actor for the film. Some websites wondered if Villu would promote his career, or give him another average response, like his previous films Azhagiya Tamil Magan and Kuruvi, which proved to be average grossers at the box-office due to their weak storyline and screenplay. Nayantara was confirmed the film's lead actress upon the film's launch. Vadivelu was also confirmed for a supporting role. Earlier reports claimed that Biju Menon or Napoleon were to be given a supporting role, but later the role went to Manoj K. Jayan. Vaiyapuri, Khushbu, and Kovai Sarala were also said to be given roles in the film. However, Khushbu was later confirmed an item number appearance while Sarala was to sing a song in the film.

Music

The soundtrack for this film was composed by Devi Sri Prasad. Three of the songs, "Jalsa Jalsa", "Dheemthanakka Thillana", and "Daddy Mummy" had their beats reused from three Telugu songs DSP had previously composed: the eponymous song from Jalsa ,"Om Namaste Bolo" from Ready, and "Akalesthey" from Shankar Dada Zindabad respectively.

Release
The satellite rights of the film were sold to Kalaignar TV. Villu had a limited Blu-ray DVD release in United Kingdom and Japan.

Reception
This film was released on 12 January 2009, on the same day as Prabhu Deva and Vijay's 2007 film Pokkiri. It received negative  reviews from fans and critics. Behindwoods.com gave 1.5 on 5 and said "With tacky production values, shabby cinematography and amateurish direction Villu comes across as a more than two-hour long." while another website stated "On the whole, Vijay's Villu is an action-packed mass masala film for his ardent fans but with loose ends." Rediff reviewed the film "Leave your brains behind and prepare to enjoy the adventures of a Tamil James Bond." and rated 2.5/5. Ananda Vikatan rated the film 37 out of 100.

References

External links
 
 

2009 films
2009 action films
Indian action films
2000s masala films
Films directed by Prabhu Deva
Tamil remakes of Hindi films
2000s Tamil-language films
Films scored by Devi Sri Prasad
Indian films about revenge
Films shot in Bangkok
Indian Army in films
Films shot in Switzerland
Indian films with live action and animation
Films about military personnel
Films set in Tiruchirappalli
Films shot in Palani
Films shot in Karaikudi